Wilhelmsen is a surname. Notable people with the surname include:

Arne Wilhelmsen (1929–2020), Norwegian businessman
Frederick Wilhelmsen (1923–1996), American philosopher and professor in the Thomist tradition
Lars Wilhelmsen (born 1946), Norwegian civil servant
Thorvald Wilhelmsen (1912–1996), Norwegian long-distance runner, specialized in the 10,000 metres
Tom Wilhelmsen (born 1983), former Major League Baseball relief pitcher
Unni Wilhelmsen (born 1971), Norwegian singer, songwriter and musician

See also
Wallenius Wilhelmsen Logistics, privately owned Norwegian/Swedish shipping company
Wilh. Wilhelmsen (WWH) is a global maritime industry group, headquartered in Lysaker, Norway
Willemsen (disambiguation)
Williamson (disambiguation)

Patronymic surnames
Surnames from given names